Ieud is a commune in Maramureș County, Maramureș, Romania. The commune is situated in the central part of Maramureș County, on the banks of the Ieudișor, a tributary of the Iza River. It is composed of a single village, Ieud.

History

The commune was first mentioned in 1391 in a manuscript called the Codicele de la Ieud. This was found in Ieud's Church of the Nativity of the Mother of God. The church is the oldest of eight Wooden Churches of Maramureș that are listed by UNESCO as a World Heritage Site.

Natives
Ștefan Hrușcă
Victor Mihaly de Apșa

References

Communes in Maramureș County
Localities in Romanian Maramureș